Pointe aux Barques Lighthouse is an active lighthouse located in Huron County in the U.S. state of Michigan.  It is located along the shores of Lake Huron on the northeastern tip of the Thumb.  Originally constructed in 1848, it is one of the oldest active lighthouses in the state.  The name is translated as "point of little boats" from the French language, which refers to the shallow coastline that poses a threat to larger boats.

History
In the mid-19th century most travel was by sailing vessel.  There were few or no roads, and only a few steamships were operating on the Great Lakes.  Navigation was still primitive by today's standards.  Vessels followed the coastline of the lakes until there was a need to cross a large body of water, and then a compass and sextant were the major navigation tools.

Sailing schooners left Detroit and the St. Clair River and soon left the sight of the 1825 Fort Gratiot Light and began the perilous trip north along the Lake Huron shore. Any vessel sailing up the Lake Huron coast stood a good chance of running aground on the reef extending out from Pointe aux Barques. The reef is only covered by some two feet of water and stuck out nearly two miles into Lake Huron.

Pointe aux Barques was also used as a turning point for vessels destined to the Saginaw River.  A lighthouse had been established at the mouth of the Saginaw River as early as 1841, but the trip to Saginaw Bay required steering clear of Pointe aux Barques reef.

President James K. Polk appropriated $5,000 to build the first lighthouse structure on July 3, 1847.  The first keeper, Peter Shook, and his family moved in in 1848. In 1849 the keeper's dwelling burned to the ground. The first light tower was built on this location in 1847, at a cost of $5,000.  It was first lit for the 1848 shipping season.  The tower was poorly constructed and needed to be replaced after only 10 years.

A rotating Third Order Fresnel lens provided a flash every two minutes visible as far as  out on the lake. The tower is attached to a 2-story, brick keeper's dwelling by a matching brick passageway.

The new taller light tower helped guide vessels away from the hazardous reef, but wrecks continued to occur.  In 1875 a United States Life Saving Service station was built just south of the lighthouse.

An assistant keeper's house was added in 1908, and the light was upgraded to an incandescent vapor lamp in 1914.

Electrification came to Point aux Barques in 1932 and the incandescent light bulb in the Third Order lens with bull's-eyes provided an output of 120,000 candlepower.  The Coast Guard assumed responsibility for the nation's aids to navigation in 1939, and the way was paved for complete automation.  The signal was further improved around 1950 with the removal of the Fresnel lens and the installation of rotating DCB-224 aero beacons rated at 1,000,000 candlepower.  Putting aside questions of nostalgia, aesthetics, or appreciation for the engineering of a bygone era (as exemplified by the Fresnel lens), this iteration of lighthouse illumination is itself incredibly effective, and an endangered remnant of another bygone era.

Michigan Historical Marker
On Sunday, August 5, 2007, a Michigan Historical Marker was dedicated at the grounds of the lighthouse.  Cindy Krueger, an employee of the Department of History, Arts, and Libraries (HAL) and the great-great-great-granddaughter of light keepers Peter and Catherine Shook, presented the marker.

The State Historic Preservation Office, which administers the Michigan Historical Marker Program, awarded a $31,000 Michigan Lighthouse Assistance Grant to the county for a historic structures report and plans and specifications for the restoration of the lighthouse.  The Michigan Lighthouse Assistance Grant is funded through the sale of the "Save our Lights" specialty license plates.  The county received an additional $70,000 CMI (Clean Michigan Initiative) grant from the Department of Environmental Quality for restoration.

Since the Michigan Historical Marker Program began in 1955, the Michigan Historical Commission has placed more than 1,500 markers throughout the state.  The markers are paid for with donations from sponsors who submit application packages to the State Historic Preservation Office.  The Michigan Historical Commission determines the placement and wording of official state markers which are the property of the State of Michigan.  The Pointe Aux Barques Lighthouse Society donated the $2,875 for the marker.

The text on the Historical Marker reads as follows:

Point aux Barques Lighthouse

The Point aux Barques Lighthouse and Lifesaving Station aided mariners for over a century, beginning in 1847.  That year the U.S. Lighthouse Service built the first lighthouse on this site to mark the turning point of Lake Huron into Saginaw Bay and to warn of shallow waters.  Catherine Shook became Michigan’s first female light keeper when she took over for her husband, Peter, after he drowned in 1849.  In 1857, the lighthouse and dwelling were replaced with the present 89 foot tower and attached house.  In 1908, the brick assistant keeper’s house was built.  The lighthouse was fully automated in 1934.  Five years later, the last keeper retired, and the lifesaving station, made up of 15 buildings, was decommissioned.

Pointe aux Barques today
The 1857 tower and attached keepers dwelling remain intact, along with the 1908 assistant keeper's dwelling and a round, iron oil house.  The keeper's dwelling is home to a museum.  One room contains memorabilia of the lighthouse, its history, and keepers.  Many original documents and pictures are on display.  Another room interprets the many ship wrecks that lie under the local waters.

Following automation, the lighthouse grounds were turned over to Huron County. The transfer was completed in June, 2003.  The tower is an active aid to navigation and is not open to the public.  A camp ground was established near the light station in the area where an 1876 United States Life Saving Service (USLSS) station had been located.

A group of students from Western Michigan University performed an archeological dig at the site in 2003. They unearthed evidence of an 1840s lighthouse structure that preceded the 1857 building.  It was also repaired extensively in 2005.

In 1972, the lighthouse was listed in the National Register of Historic Places, Reference #73000949.  On site are two museums, namely - "THE KEEPERS OF THE LIGHT" and "THE THUMB UNDERWATER PRESERVE".  The original Third Order Fresnel lens, from Pointe aux Barques, is on display at the museum in Huron City.

The Pointe aux Barques Lighthouse Society (PaBLS), founded in 2002, is dedicated to preserving and restoring the light station and museum located inside.

In 2008, an exterior historical restoration project was successfully completed by National Restoration, Inc.

In October–November 2017, two Life-Saving Service structures were moved to sit about 100 feet from the Pointe aux Barques Lighthouse, and set on new foundations. The two buildings were originally constructed along the shore about 1,000 feet south-by-southeast of their current location, and had been moved to the Huron City Historic District in 1964.

Location
It is a Huron County park. A campground is located adjacent to the base of the light. Visitors can easily spend the better part of a day touring the lighthouse grounds and museum or just enjoying the beauty of the Lake Huron shore.

See also
Great Lakes Storm of 1913
Lighthouses in the United States
The Michigan Historical Marker Web Site 
Port Hope's Pointe aux Barques Lighthouse to Receive Michigan Historical Marker Aug. 5 
National Restoration, Inc. 
Shipwrecks of the 1913 Great Lakes storm

References

Further reading

 Bibliography on Michigan lighthouses.
 Crompton, Samuel Willard  & Michael J. Rhein, The Ultimate Book of Lighthouses (2002) ; .
 Hyde, Charles K., and Ann and John Mahan. The Northern Lights: Lighthouses of the Upper Great Lakes.  Detroit: Wayne State University Press, 1995.    .
 Jones, Ray & Bruce Roberts, American Lighthouses (Globe Pequot, September 1, 1998, 1st Ed.) ; .
 Jones, Ray,The Lighthouse Encyclopedia, The Definitive Reference (Globe Pequot, January 1, 2004, 1st ed.) ; .
 Noble, Dennis, Lighthouses & Keepers: U. S. Lighthouse Service and Its Legacy (Annapolis: U. S. Naval Institute Press, 1997). ; .
 Oleszewski, Wes, Great Lakes Lighthouses, American and Canadian: A Comprehensive Directory/Guide to Great Lakes Lighthouses, (Gwinn, Michigan: Avery Color Studios, Inc., 1998) .
 Penrod, John, Lighthouses of Michigan, (Berrien Center, Michigan: Penrod/Hiawatha, 1998)  .
 
 Putnam, George R., Lighthouses and Lightships of the United States, (Boston: Houghton Mifflin Co., 1933).
 United States Coast Guard, Aids to Navigation, (Washington, DC: U. S. Government Printing Office, 1945).
 
 
 Wagner, John L., Michigan Lighthouses: An Aerial Photographic Perspective, (East Lansing, Michigan: John L. Wagner, 1998)  .
 Wargin, Ed, Legends of Light: A Michigan Lighthouse Portfolio (Ann Arbor Media Group, 2006).  .
 Wright, Larry and Wright, Patricia, Great Lakes Lighthouses Encyclopedia Hardback (Erin: Boston Mills Press, 2006)

External links

 Pointe Aux Barques Lighthouse Society - official site
 Interactive map of Lighthouses in the area.
 Lighthouse Central, Point Aux Barques Lighthouse Photographs, History and Directions, The Ultimate Guide to East Michigan Lighthouses by Jerry Roach (Publisher: Bugs Publishing LLC). ; .

Lighthouses completed in 1848
Houses completed in 1848
Lighthouses completed in 1857
Houses completed in 1857
Lighthouses on the National Register of Historic Places in Michigan
Harbor Beach, Michigan
Museums in Huron County, Michigan
Lighthouse museums in Michigan
1848 establishments in Michigan
Saginaw Bay
National Register of Historic Places in Huron County, Michigan
Michigan State Historic Sites